Cedrik-Marcel Stebe won the title, beating Yannik Reuter 6–1, 4–6, 6–2

Seeds

Draw

Finals

Top half

Bottom half

References
 Main Draw
 Qualifying Draw

Morocco Tennis Tour - Meknes - Singles
2013 Singles
Tennis Tour - Meknes - Singles